Federnagh is a townland of 234 acres in County Armagh, Northern Ireland. It is situated in the civil parish of Ballymore and the historic barony of Orior Lower.

The village of Poyntzpass is partly in this townland.

See also
List of townlands in County Armagh

References

Townlands of County Armagh
Civil parish of Ballymore, County Armagh